Richard E. Grant (1927–1994) was an American paleontologist.

Biography
Grant was born in 1927. From 1972 until his death he served as a Chairman, Curator, and a Senior Geologist in the Department of Paleobiology and National Museum of Natural History. He is most famous for studying Brachiopods of Permian period in 1979. He died in 1994.

References

American paleontologists
1927 births
1995 deaths